Edward Robert Pacy Moon (1858 – 11 September 1949) was a British barrister and Conservative MP for St Pancras North.

He won the seat from the Liberals in 1895, held it in 1900, but lost it back to them in the 1906 landslide.

He was educated at Winchester College and Oxford University, and qualified as a barrister.

He married Frideswide, daughter of Sir Arthur Kekewich.

Sources
Craig, F.W.S. British Parliamentary Election Results 1885-1918
Whitaker's Almanack, 1896 to 1910 editions

Conservative Party (UK) MPs for English constituencies
1859 births
1949 deaths
Alumni of New College, Oxford
People educated at Winchester College
Members of the Inner Temple